Agera may refer to:

 Agera (festival), a thanksgiving harvest festival in Mumbai
 Priscilla Agera (born 1978), Nigerian volleyball player
 Koenigsegg Agera, a 2010–2018 Swedish mid-engine sports car

See also
 Agara (disambiguation)
 Agora (disambiguation)
 Agra (disambiguation)